The House of Bhonsle (or Bhonsale, Bhosale, Bhosle) are a prominent Indian royal house.  They claimed descent from the Sisodia Dynasty, but were likely Kunbi Maratha.

They served as the Chhatrapati or Emperor of the Maratha Confederacy from 1674 to 1818, where they gained imperial dominance of the Indian Subcontinent. They also ruled several states such as Satara, Kolhapur, Thanjavur, Nagpur, 

Akkalkot, Sawantwadi and Barshi.

The House of Bhonsle was founded in 1577 by Maloji Bhosale, a predominant general or sardar of Malik Ambar of the Ahmadnagar Sultanate. In 1595 or 1599, Maloji was given the title of raja by Bahadur Nizam Shah, the ruler of the Ahmadnagar Sultanate. He was later granted was given the jagir of Pune, Elur (Verul), Derhadi, Kannarad and Supe. He was also given control over the first of the Shivneri and Chakan. These positions were inherited by his sons Shahaji and Sharifji, who were named after a Muslim Sufi Shah Sharif

Origins 

The origins of the Bhonsles in unclear. According to Jadunath Sarkar and other scholars, Bhonsles were predominantly Deccani tiller-plainsmen from the Shudra caste; they were part of the Marathas/Kunbis, an amorphous class-group. Scholars have however disagreed about the agricultural status of Bhosles. Rosalind O'Hanlon notes that the historical evolution of castes grouped under the Maratha-Kunbis is sketchy. Ananya Vajpeyi rejects the designation of Shudra, since the category has remained in a state of flux across centuries; she instead notes them to be a Marathi lineage, who enjoyed "reasonably high" social status as landholders and warlords, being in the service of Deccan Sultanate or Mughals.

According to R. C. Dhere's interpretation of local oral history and ethnography, Bhonsles descend from the Hoysalas and Yadavas of Devagiri, who were cow-herding Gavli sovereigns. In early thirteenth century, "Baliyeppa Gopati Sirsat", a Hoysala cousin of Simhana migrated from Gadag to Satara along with his pastoral herd and kul-devta; the Sambhu Mahadev was thus installed at a hill-top in Singhnapur. Historical records indicate that this shrine received extensive patronage from Maloji onwards. Further, there exists a branch of the Bhosles named "Sirsat Bhosles" and Bhosle (or "Bhosale") is linguistically similar to "Hoysala". M. K. Dhavalikar found the work to convincingly explain the foundation of the Bhosle clan (as well as Sambhu Mahadev cult). Vajpeyi too advocates that Dhere's theory be probed in greater detail — "[f]rom pastoralist big men to warlords on horseback, is not an impossible distance to cover in two to three centuries."

Accuracy 
Vajpeyi notes the "veridical status" of Chitnis' finds to be not determinable to "historical certainty" — the links were tenuous at best and inventive at worst. Shivaji was not a Rajput and the sole purpose of the lineage was to guarantee Shivaji's consecration as a Kshatriya, in a tactic that had clear parallels to Rajputisation. Jadunath Sarkar deemed that the genealogy was cleverly fabricated by Balaji Awji and after some reluctance accepted by Gaga Bhatt, who in turn was "rewarded with a huge fee". V. K. Rajwade, Dhere, Allison Busch, John Keay and Audrey Truschke also agree with Sarkar about the fabrication. G. S. Sardesai notes that the descent is "not authentically proved". Stewart N. Gordon does not pass any judgement but notes Bhatt to be a "creative Brahmin". André Wink deems that the Sisodia genealogical claim is destined to remain disputed forever.

Establishment

Ahmadnagar Sultanate 
The earliest accepted members of the Bhonsles are Mudhoji Bhonsle and his kin Rupaji Bhonsle, who were the village headman (pāṭīl) of Hingani — this branch has been since known as Hinganikar Bhonsles. A branch seem to have split soon, who went on to claim an ancestral right to the post of district steward (deśmukhī) of Kadewalit: Suryaji Bhonsle during the reign of Ahmad Nizam Shah I (early 1490s), and his son Sharafji Bhonsle during the conquest of the region by Daniyal Mirza (1599). This branch has been since known as Kadewalit Bhonsles.

The next significant Bhonsle was probably Maloji Bhosale from the Hinganikar branch. He was the great-grandson of one Kheloji (c. 1490).

The House of Bhonsle was officially founded by Maloji Bhosale who initially served as a patil (chief) of the Hingni Berdi and Devalgaon villages around Pune. Later, along with his brother Vithoji, he migrated to Sindkhed and served as a Horseman.

In 1577, they joined the service of the Ahmadnagar Sultanate, under Sultan Murtaza Nizam Shah I. Maloji became a trusted General of the Peshwa Malik Amber fighting against rival powers such as the Mughals and Bijapur Sultanate the parganas (administrative units) of Elur (Verul), Derhadi and Kannarad. In 1595 or 1599, Maloji was given the title of raja by Bahadur Nizam Shah, officially establishing the House of Bhonsle.  On the recommendation of Malik Ambar, he was given the jagir of Pune and Supe parganas, along with the control of the Shivneri and Chakan forts. Maloji carried out the restoration of the Grishneshwar temple near Verul, and also constructed a large tank at the Shambhu Mahadev temple in Shikhar Shingnapur. Maloji and his wife Uma Bai had 2 sons: Shahaji and Sharifji, named Sufi Pir Hazrat Shah Sharif.

According to Shivabharata, composed by Shivaji's court poet Paramananda, Maloji's wife Umabai prayed to the Sufi Pir Shah Sharif of Ahmadnagar to bless her with a son. She gave birth to two sons, who were named Shahaji and Sharifji after the Pir.

Shivaji's Coronation 
By 1670s, Shivaji had acquired extensive territory and wealth from his campaigns. But, lacking a formal crown, he had no operational legitimacy to rule his de facto domain and technically, remained subject to his Mughal  (or Deccan Sultanate) overlords; in the hierarchy of power, Shivaji's position remained similar to fellow Maratha chieftains. Also, he was often opposed by the orthodox Brahmin community of Maharashtra. A coronation sanctioned by the Brahmins was thus planned, in a bid to proclaim sovereignty and legitimize his rule.

On proposing the Brahmins of his court to have him proclaimed as the rightful king, a controversy erupted: the regnal status was reserved for those belonging to the kshatriya varna. Not only was there a fundamental dispute among scholars on whether any true Kshatriya survived in the Kali Yuga, having been all destroyed by Parashurama but also Shivaji's grandfather was a tiller-headman, Shivaji did not wear the sacred thread, and his marriage was not in accordance with the Kshatriya customs. Thus, the Brahmins had him categorised as a shudra.

Compelled to postpone his coronation, Shivaji had his secretary Balaji Avji Chitnis sent to the Sisodiyas of Mewar for inspection of the royal genealogies; Avji returned with a favorable finding — Shahji turned out to be a descendant of Chacho Sisodiya, a half-Rajput uncle of Mokal Singh. Gaga Bhatt, a famed Brahmin of Banaras, was then hired to ratify Chitnis' find, and the Bhonsles were now permitted to stake a claim to Kshatriya caste. The coronation would be re-executed in June 1674 but only after going through a long list of preludes.

Led by Bhatt, who employed traditional Hindu imagery in an unprecedented scale, the first phase had Shivaji penance for having lived as a Maratha despite being a Kshatriya. Then came the sacred thread ceremony ('maunjibandhanam') followed by remarriage according to Kshatriya customs ('mantra-vivah') and a sequence of Vedic rituals before the eventual coronation ('abhisheka') — a public spectacle of enormous expense that heralded the rebirth of Shivaji as a Kshatriya king. Panegyrics composed by court-poets during these spans (and afterward) reinforced onto the public memory that Shivaji (and the Bhonsles) indeed belonged from the Sisodiyas.

However, the Kshatriyization was not unanimous; a section of Brahmins continued to deny the Kshatriya status. Brahmins of the Peshwa period rejected Bhatt's acceptance of Shivaji's claims and blamed the non-dharmic coronation for all ills that plagued Shivaji and his heirs—in tune with the general Brahminical sentiment to categorize all Marathas as Shudras, carte-blanche; there have been even claims that Bhatt was excommunicated by Maratha Brahmins for his role in the coronation of Shivaji! Interestingly, all claims to Rajput ancestry had largely vanished from the family's subsequent projections of identity.

Maratha Empire 

 
The Maratha Empire was established by Shivaji I the grandson of Maloji in 1674. This was established to invasions from the Mughal Empire and the Bijapur Sultanate. Shivaji's forces initially occupied the Fort of Torna in 1642. He had expanded his kingdom to Raigad by 1674. he crowned himself He was crowned as Chhatrapati, meaning emperor. 

Shivaji wanted to establish his government based on his Philosophy of Hindavi Swarajya. (The Rule of the People) This advocated for more representation of the people and less power of the elites. He later established the Ashta Pradhan, (Modern council of ministers) an institution of a council of eight ministers to guide the administration of his nascent state. Each of the ministers was placed in charge of an administrative department; thus, the council heralded the birth of a bureaucracy. Shivaji appointed Moropant Trimbak Pingle as the Peshwa, the leader of the council. 

Shivaji was succeeded by his son Sambhaji I. In early 1689, Sambhaji and his commanders met at Sangameshwar.  Mughal forces, under Emperor Aurangzeb attacked Sangameshwar when Sambhaji was accompanied by just a few men. Sambhaji captured by the Mughal troops on 1 February 1689. Aurangzeb had charged Sambhaji with attacks by Maratha forces on Burhanpur. He and his advisor, Kavi Kalash, were taken to Bahadurgad by the imperial army, where they were executed by the Mughals on 21 March 1689.

After the execution of Sambhaji, Rajaram I was crowned at Raigad on 12 March 1689. During the Mughal started siege on Raigad on 25 March 1689, the widow of Sambhaji (Maharani Yesubai) and Peshwa Ramchandra Pant Amatya sent young Rajaram to the stronghold of Pratapgad through Kavlya ghat.[citation needed]  Rajaram to escape through Kavlya ghat to the fort of Jinji through the Pratapgad and Vishalgad forts, Rajaram reached Keladi in disguise and pursued assistance from Keladi Chennamma - who kept the Mughal attack in check to ensure safe passage and escape of Rajaram to Jinji where he reached after a month and a half on 1 November 1689.

Kolhapur Branch 

In 1707, Mughal Emperor Muhammad Azam Shah released Shahu Bhosale, the son of Sambhaji. However, his mother was kept as a hostage of the Mughals, in order to ensure that Shahu adhered to the release conditions. Immediately the Maratha throne was claimed his aunt Tarabai, claiming the throne for her son Shivaji II. After his victory at the Battle of Khed, Shahu established himself at Satara, forcing her to retire with her son to Kolhapur.  This resulted in the creation of the Kolhapur branch in 1709 under Tarabai, splitting from the main Satara branch under Shahu.. Shivaji II and Tarabai were soon deposed by Rajasbai, the other widow of Rajaram. She installed her own son, Sambhaji II as the new ruler of Kolhapur. Sambhaji  then made alliance with the Nizam. The defeat of the Nizam by Bajirao I in the Battle of Palkhed in 1728  led to the former ending his support for Sambhaji. Sambhaji II signed the Treaty of Warna in 1731 with his cousin Shahuji to formalize the two separate seats of Bhonsle family.

Maratha Confederacy

Confederacy era 

Shahu appointed Balaji Vishwanath a member of the Bhat Family as his Peshwa. The Peshwa was instrumental in securing Mughal recognition of Shahu as the rightful heir of Shivaji and the Chhatrapati of the Marathas. Balaji also gained the release of Shahu's mother, Yesubai, from Mughal captivity in 1719. 

The Peshwas later became de facto rulers of the Maratha Empire. Under the Peshwas, Chhatrapati was limited to simply a monarchial figurehead.  Maratha Empire dominated most of the Indian subcontinent. 

Under the Peshwas the Marathas expanded to their greatest extent. 1737, Under Bajirao I invaded Delhi in a blitzkrieg manner at the Battle of Delhi (1737). The Nizam set out from the Deccan to rescue the Mughals from the invasion of the Marathas, but was defeated decisively in the Battle of Bhopal. The Marathas extracted a large tribute from the Mughals and signed a treaty which ceded Malwa to the Marathas. The Battle of Vasai was fought between the Marathas and the Portuguese in Vasai, a village lying on the northern shore of Vasai creek. (Part of modern day Mumbai) 

After Shahu's death, he was succeeded by Rajaram II  When Peshwa Balaji Baji Rao left for the Mughal frontier, Tarabai urged Rajaram II to remove him from the post of Peshwa. When Rajaram refused, she imprisoned him in a dungeon at Satara, on 24 November 1750. She claimed that he was an imposter from Gondhali caste and she had falsely presented him as her grandson to Shahu. His health deteriorated considerably during this imprisonment. On 14 September 1752, Tarabai and Balaji Rao took an oath at Khandoba temple in Jejuri, promising mutual peace.  Nevertheless, the Peshwa retained Rajaram II as the titular Chhatrapati and a powerless figurehead.

Peshwa Bajirao and his three chiefs, Pawar (Dhar), Holkar (Indore), and Scindia (Gwalior), expanded it northwards up to Peshawar. He also expanded it up to Kaveri river.

Nagpur Branch 

After the death of Chand Sultan, the Gond ruler of Deogarh, in 1739, there were quarrels over the succession, leading to the throne being usurped by Wali Shah, an illegitimate son of Bakht Buland Shah.   Chand Sultan's widow Ratan Kunwar invoked the aid of the Maratha leader Raghoji Bhonsle of Berar in the interest of her sons Akbar Shah and Burhan Shah. Wali Shah was put to death and the rightful heirs placed on the throne. Raghoji I Bhonsle was sent back to Berar with a plentiful bounty for his aid. Raghoji then declared himself the King of Nagpur and the 'protector' of the Gond king. Thus in 1743, Burhan Shah was practically made a state pensionary, with real power being in the hands of the Maratha ruler. After this event the history of the Gond kingdom of Deogarh is not recorded.

During Shahu's reign, Raghoji Bhosale of Nagpur expanded the empire Eastwards, reaching present-day Bengal. Khanderao Dabhade and later his son, Triambakrao, expanded it Westwards into Gujarat. In the Battle of Damalcherry in 1740, which was a major confrontation with the Nawab of the Carnatic, Dost Ali Khan . Raghoji was victorious and increased Maratha Influence in the Carnatic. 

after the successful campaign in Carnatic at the Battle of Trichinopolly. Raghoji invaded Bengal. Raghoji was able to annex Orissa and parts of Bengal permanently as he successfully exploited the chaotic conditions prevailing in the region  after the death of their Governor Murshid Quli Khan in 1727. Nawab of Bengal ceded territory up to the river Suvarnarekha to the Marathas, and agreeing to pay Rs. 20 lacs as chauth for Bengal (includes both West Bengal and Bangladesh) and 12 lacs for Bihar (including Jharkhand), thus Bengal becoming a tributary to the Marathas.

Thanjavur Branch 

The Bhonsoles were also influential in the Carnatic Region.  In 1675, the Sultan of Bijapur sent a force commanded by the Maratha general Venkoji a half-brother of the Shivaji, to Capture the city of Thanjavur and Established the Thanjavur Maratha Kingdom.  Venkoji defeated Alagiri, and occupied Thanjavur. He did not, however, place his protege on the throne as instructed by the Bijapur Sultan, but seized the kingdom and made himself king. Thus began the rule of the  Marathas over Thanjavur. Vyankoji also allied with Chokkanatha of Madurai to repulse an invasion from Mysore.

Shivaji Maharaj also invaded Gingee and Thanjavur in 1676–1677 and made his brother Santaji the ruler of all lands to the north of the Coleroon.

Princely States 
Satara State, Kolhapur State, Thanjavur State, Nagpur State, 

Akkalkot State, Sawantwadi State and Barshi were amongst the prominent states ruled by the Bhonsles.

List of  Members

Maratha Empire

Maratha Confederacy

Satara State

Kolhapur State

Nagpur state

See also

List of Maratha dynasties and states
List of people involved in the Maratha Empire

Notes

References

Maratha clans
Marathi-language surnames
Hindu dynasties
Indian surnames